Cumaru is a city in the state of Pernambuco, Brazil. It is 132 km away from the state capital Recife, and has an estimated (IBGE 2020) population of 10,192 inhabitants.

Geography

 State - Pernambuco
 Region - Agreste Pernambucano
 Boundaries - Surubim   (N);  Bezerros    (S);  Passira   (E);   Riacho das Almas     (W).
 Area - 292.24 km2
 Elevation - 443 m
 Hydrography - Capibaribe River
 Vegetation - Caatinga hipoxerófila
 Climate - Semi arid hot
 Annual average temperature - 25.0 c
 Distance to Recife - 132 km

Economy

The main economic activities in Cumaru are based in agribusiness, especially beans, corn; and livestock such as cattle, sheep, goats, pigs and poultry.

Economic indicators

Economy by Sector
2006

Health indicators

References

Municipalities in Pernambuco